Bremont Watch Company is a luxury aviation-themed British watchmaker based in England. Annual production is approximately 10,000 pieces  for an approximate annual revenue of £40 million.

History
Bremont was founded by brothers Nick and Giles English. The brothers had gained mechanical experience from their father Dr Euan English. This involved from clock assembly, aeroplane- and yacht construction. On 4 March 1995 Euan English was killed and Nick was badly injured when their World War II-vintage Harvard aircraft crashed during a training flight for an air show. The crash spurred the brothers to purchase North Weald Flying Services and after working there together they decided to create their own watch company.

In 2021, the company opened the Bremont Manufacturing & Technology Centre, known as "The Wing", a 35,000-square-foot manufacturing facility where it machines components and assembles timepieces. At full capacity, the company expects The Wing can manufacture up to 50,000 watches annually, which would be five times their current output. The company estimates The Wing and the machinery cost more than £25 million ($34 million).

Awards
Since its founding, Bremont have received awards in various fields: Watch Pro ‘Watch Company Of The Year’ 2019; HSBC Global Connections, overall winner, 2013; UK Retail Jewellery Awards, Luxury Watch Brand Of The Year and Store Design Of The Year 2013; Watch Pro ‘Luxury Watch Of The Year’ 2012; Luxury Briefing Awards, ‘Breakthrough Brand’, 2012; UK Jewellery Awards, ‘Watch Brand of the Year Award’, 2011; Walpole British Luxury ‘Best Emerging British Luxury Brand’ 2008.

Military
Bremont has created a number of special-edition watches for serving or former members of the armed forces, based on its commercial models. Purchases of these watches are restricted to people who have flown in the subject aircraft, served in the military units commemorated or, in one case, served on board a particular warship.

Bremont have been a long-time supporter of the armed services through its work with Help for Heroes, The Royal British Legion and official supporter of the UK Team for the Invictus Games.  This relationship culminated in the launch of a completely new HMAF range of watches following an agreement which sees Bremont given the license to use signs, symbols, and Heraldic Badges from all three branches of Britain’s Armed Forces.

References

External links
 
The Bremont Story

Watch manufacturing companies of the United Kingdom
British brands
Watch brands
British companies established in 2002
Manufacturing companies established in 2002